Andrew Alex Sabados (November 24, 1916 – July 5, 2004) was an American football guard who played two seasons with the Chicago Cardinals of the National Football League (NFL). He was drafted by the Cardinals in the thirteenth round of the 1939 NFL Draft. He played college football at The Citadel, The Military College of South Carolina and attended East Aurora High School in Aurora, Illinois.

College career
Sabados played college football for The Citadel Bulldogs. He lettered for the Bulldogs from 1936 to 1938. He was captain, an All-State selection and SoCon Jacobs Blocking Award winner his senior year in 1938.

Professional career
Sabados was selected by the Chicago Cardinals of the NFL with the 111th pick in the 1939 NFL Draft.

References

External links
Just Sports Stats

1916 births
2004 deaths
Players of American football from Illinois
American football guards
The Citadel Bulldogs football players
Chicago Cardinals players
Sportspeople from Aurora, Illinois
People from Mundelein, Illinois